SCRI may refer to:

Scottish Crop Research Institute
The Supply Chain Resilience Initiative 
Seattle Children's Research Institute, a unit of Seattle's Children's hospital